Race After Technology: Abolitionist Tools for the New Jim Code is a 2019 American book focusing on a range of ways in which social hierarchies, particularly racism, are embedded in the logical layer of internet-based technologies. It won the 2020 Oliver Cox Cromwell Book Prize, 2020 Brooklyn Public Library Literary Award for Nonfiction, and Honorable Mention for the 2020 Communication, Information Technologies, and Media Sociology Book Award, and has been widely reviewed.

Overview 
Dr. Ruha Benjamin is a sociologist and a Professor in the Department of African American Studies at Princeton University. The primary focus of her work is the relationship between innovation and equity, particularly focusing on the intersection of race, justice and technology. 

Race After Technology: Abolitionist Tools for the New Jim Code was published by Polity in 2019. In it, Benjamin develops her concept of the "New Jim Code," which references Michelle Alexander's work The New Jim Crow, to analyze how seemingly "neutral" algorithms and applications can replicate or worsen racial bias. A review in The Nation noted that,

Reception 
Race After Technology won the 2020 Oliver Cox Cromwell Book Prize awarded by the American Sociological Association Section on Race & Ethnic Relations, 2020 Brooklyn Public Library Literary Award for Nonfiction, and Honorable Mention for the 2020 Communication, Information Technologies, and Media Sociology Book Award. It was also selected by Fast Company as one of “8 Books on Technology You Should Read in 2020.”

References

External links 
 Download discussion guide for Race After Technology here
#NewJimCode on Twitter

2019 non-fiction books
American non-fiction books
Facial recognition software
Race and crime in the United States
Artificial intelligence publications
Works about security and surveillance
Polity (publisher) books